Lokey is a surname. Notable people with the surname include:

Derek Lokey (born 1985), American football defensive tackle
Hicks Lokey (1904–1990), American animator
Lorry I. Lokey (1927-2022), American businessperson and philanthropist

See also
Houlihan Lokey, international investment bank
Lokey Peak, small, sharp peak or nunatak, in the Gutenko Mountains of central Palmer Land, Antarctica
Norok Lokey, 1969 Khmer film starring Chea Yuthon and Sak Si Sboung
Lo-Key?, former American funk/R&B band that formed in Kansas City, Missouri and Minneapolis, Minnesota, United States
Lo-Key Fu, contemporary producer, performer and remixer based in Perth, Western Australia
Lo Key, American creator of music and visual arts